Laura Holly Aikman (born 24 December 1985) is an English actress. She is best known for her roles as Debbie in Not Going Out and Gavin and Stacey as Sonia.

Early life
Aikman was born in the London Borough of Brent in 1985, the daughter of actor and writer Stuart Aikman (known as Stuart St. Paul) and actress Jean Heard. She attended Haberdashers' Aske's School for Girls in Elstree, Hertfordshire.

Career
In 2009, she appeared in the BBC Three series Personal Affairs playing Lucy. On 8 August 2009, it was announced that Aikman would be joining the cast of Casualty, and her role as May Phelps started on 12 September 2009. Aikman appeared in 35 episodes, her final appearance aired on 8 May 2010.

In 2012, Aikman starred alongside Leigh Francis's alter ego Keith Lemon in his TV show Lemon La Vida Loca during the first series. She played the role of his Yorkshire girlfriend, Rosie. Aikman announced that she would not be returning to the show for the second series despite making an appearance in episode 1. In July 2014, it was announced that Aikman would be joining the cast of Waterloo Road for the tenth and final series as deputy headteacher Lorna Hutchinson. In 2014-15, Aikman had a leading role in the second and third series of The Job Lot.

In 2018, Aikman joined 26 other celebrities at Metropolis Studios, to perform an original Christmas song called "Rock With Rudolph", which was written and produced by Grahame and Jack Corbyn. The song was released in aid of Great Ormond Street Hospital and was released digitally on independent record label Saga Entertainment on 30 November 2018 under the artist name The Celebs. The music video debuted exclusively with The Sun on 29 November 2018 and had its first TV showing on Good Morning Britain on 30 November 2018. The song peaked at number two on the iTunes pop chart.

Personal life
Aikman is married to fellow actor Matt Kennard. Aikman volunteered with Shout 85258, providing mental health support throughout 2022.

Filmography

Film

Television

Theatre
 Princess Catherine in Henry V.
 Rebecca Foley in Pravda.
 Connie Batsford in Bus.
 Blousie Brown in Bugsy Malone (musical).

Video games

References

External links

 

1985 births
Living people
People educated at Haberdashers' Girls' School
21st-century English actresses
English film actresses
English television actresses
English stage actresses
People from the London Borough of Brent